Make You Mine may refer to:

 "Make You Mine" (Nina song), 2003 
 "Make You Mine" (Talay Riley song), 2011 
 "Make You Mine" (High Valley song), 2014
 "Make You Mine", 2006 song by Vanessa Hudgens from V
 "Make You Mine", 2008 song by Miami Horror from Bravado
 "Make You Mine", 2008 song by Crossin Dixon
 "Make You Mine", 2011 single by 2AM Club from What Did You Think Was Going to Happen?